Bassi may refer to:

People
Bassi Maestro (born 1973) (also known simply as Bassi), Italian rapper, deejay, beatmaker
 Bassi (surname)

Places
 Bassi Falls, a waterfall in the Sierra Nevada in California
 Bassi Department, a department or commune of Burkina Faso
 Bassi, India, a settlement in Rajasthan
 Bassi, Bhulath, India, a village in Bhulath tehsil, Kapurthala district, Punjab state, India
 Bassi (sanctuary), a wildlife sanctuary in India
 Bassi dam, an earthry dam in Chittorgarh